Ye Chun is a Chinese American writer and literary translator. Her book of poetry, Lantern Puzzle, won the 2011 Berkshire Prize.  She received an NEA fellowship in 2015 and a Pushcart Prize for her poem "The Luoyang Poem" in 2017, a second Pushcart Prize in 2018 for her story, "Milk," , and a third in 2020 for her story, "Hao." Her collection of stories, Hao, was published by Catapult in 2021 and was longlisted for 2022 Andrew Carnegie Medals for Excellence in fiction.

Life 
She was born in Luoyang, China, and moved to the U.S. in 1999. She received an MFA in poetry from the University of Virginia, and a PhD in Literature and Creative Writing from the University of Missouri. She teaches at Providence College.

Her novel in Chinese,《海上的桃树》(Peach Tree in the Sea) was published by People's Literature Publishing House in 2011. She has translated works by Hai Zi, Yang Jian, Galway Kinnell, and Li-Young Lee. Her collection of translations, Ripened Wheat: Selected Poems by Hai Zi, was shortlisted for the 2016 Lucien Stryk Asian Translation Award.

Works 
Poetry 
 Lantern Puzzle, Tupelo Press, 2015 
 Travel over Water, Bitter Oleander Press, 2005 

Fiction 
 Hao, Catapult, 2021 
 《海上的桃树》(Peach Tree in the Sea), 人民文学出版社 / People's Literature Publishing House, 2011 

Translation 
 Ripened Wheat: Selected Poems of Hai Zi, Bitter Oleander Press, 2015 
 Long River: Poems by Yang Jian, Tinfish Press, 2018 (co-translator)

References

External links 
 
 Faculty page at Providence College

Year of birth missing (living people)
Living people
Writers from Luoyang
Poets from Henan
University of Missouri alumni
University of Virginia alumni
Providence College faculty
21st-century American women writers
21st-century Chinese women writers
21st-century Chinese writers
Chinese emigrants to the United States
American writers of Chinese descent
American women academics